Irones are a group of methylionone odorants used in perfumery, derived from iris oil, e.g. orris root. The most commercially important of these are:

 (-)-cis-γ-irone, and
 (-)-cis-α-irone

Irones form through slow oxidation of triterpenoids in dried rhizomes of the iris species, Iris pallida. Irones typically have a sweet floral, iris, woody, ionone, odor.

See also
 Ionone

References

External links

 Structure - Odor Relationships

Perfume ingredients
Ketones